The 2008–09 season was Crystal Palace Football Club's 4th consecutive season in the Championship, after their play-off defeat in the previous campaign.

Statistics
Last updated on 10 January 2010.

            

|}

Club

Management

League table

Matches

Preseason

Errea South West Challenge Cup

Group phase

Crystal Palace finished second in their group with three points and thus qualified for the semifinal stage. However, with the squad heavily depleted through injury, Palace opted to give their semifinal place to third-placed team Torquay United

Football League Championship

Football League Cup

Round 1

Round 2

FA Cup

Round 3

Round 4

End-of-season awards

References

Notes

External links
 Crystal Palace F.C. official website
 Crystal Palace F.C. on Soccerbase
 Crystal Palace F.C. Reserve site

Crystal Palace F.C. seasons
Crystal Palace